Mater Women's and Children's Hospital in Hyde Park Townsville, Queensland was established in 2007 when the Sisters of Mercy (Mater Health Services North Queensland) bought the competing private obstetric hospital, the Wesley/Park Haven Hospital.

History 
The Park Haven Private Hospital opened in 1937, and was purchased by the Brisbane UnitingCare Wesley Hospital in 1999.

Facilities 
The Mater Women's and Children's Hospital has a bed capacity of 58. Current specialty areas represented are gynaecology, obstetrics, paediatrics, general surgery, orthopaedics, urology, oncology, and plastic surgery.

References

External links
 

Hospitals in Townsville
Catholic hospitals in Oceania
Women's hospitals